Tadelesh Birra (born 24 April 1975) is an Ethiopian long-distance runner. In 2001, she competed in the women's marathon at the 2001 World Championships in Athletics held in Edmonton, Alberta, Canada. She finished in 31st place.

She won the women's race at the Hannover Marathon in Hannover, Germany both in 2003 and in 2004. In 2009, she won the inaugural edition of the Amman Marathon held in Amman, Jordan.

References

External links 
 

Living people
1975 births
Place of birth missing (living people)
Ethiopian female long-distance runners
Ethiopian female marathon runners
World Athletics Championships athletes for Ethiopia
21st-century Ethiopian women